The Irish League in season 1897–98 comprised 6 teams, and Linfield won the championship.

League standings

Results

References
Northern Ireland - List of final tables (RSSSF)

1897-98
1897–98 domestic association football leagues
Lea